Boris at Last -Feedbacker- (or simply called Feedbacker) is the sixth album by Japanese experimental music band Boris. The album, a single 43-minute track broken into 5 movements, incorporates many different rock elements. The band frequently revisits the song in concert.

On September 13, 2009, as a special set for the Flaming Lips-curated All Tomorrow's Parties New York 2009 in Monticello, Boris performed Feedbacker in its entirety. They performed the album again at the Pavement-curated ATP at Minehead Butlin's on May 15, 2010. An official DVD, limited to 500 copies, was released in 2005 by Diwphalanx Records. This DVD was originally an unofficial recording of the band performing the entirety of Feedbacker live in New York and entitled Bootleg -Feedbacker-. The official DVD release depicts a different member of the band lying in a pool of blood similar to Wata on the album cover.

Track listing 
On the LP release the track is split into two parts, one on each side. The original Japanese LP as well as the reissue on Third Man Records contains a locked groove on both sides.

Personnel
 Takeshi – guitar, bass, vocals
 Atsuo – drums, vocals
 Wata – guitar, effects
 Boris – production
 Souichirou Nakamura – mixing, mastering

Pressing history

References

External links
 

2003 albums
Boris (band) albums
Diwphalanx Records albums